The 1st Armoured Brigade, raised as the 1st Light Armoured, later the 1st Armoured Brigade Group, was an armoured formation of the British Army.

History 
At the start of World War II, the brigade was based in the United Kingdom, initially as part of the 1st Armoured Division and then as part of the newly formed 2nd Armoured Division. In November 1940, it was shipped to Egypt, arriving on 1 January 1941. In March 1941, the brigade was dispatched to Greece as part of General Maitland Wilson's unsuccessful attempt at stopping the German invasion. On 29 April 1941, the brigade was evacuated to Egypt.

The 1st Armoured Brigade served in the Western Desert Campaign with the 7th Armoured Division at the Battle of El Alamein. The brigade was disbanded on 21 November 1942.

Order of Battle 
The Order of battle of the brigade during the war was: (day/month/year), units in order of precedence.

Armoured Brigade Establishment

 Brigade Headquarters & Signal Section, Royal Corps of Signals
 Armoured
 1st (The King's) Dragoon Guards 3/9/39–5/6/42
 3rd (The King's Own) Hussars 3/9/39–24/1/41
 4th (The Queen's Own) Hussars 3/9/39–5/6/42
 8th (The King's Royal Irish) Hussars 10/5/41–8/8/41
 1st Royal Tank Regiment 21/1/42–1/6/42
 3rd Royal Tank Regiment 11/8/40–28/10/40 and again 13/2/41–8/8/41
 6th Royal Tank Regiment 5/5/42–5/6/42
 Infantry
 1st Battalion, The Rangers 25/2/41–21/3/41
 9th (The Rangers) Battalion, The King's Royal Rifle Corps 22/3/41–11/2/42 (same unit as above, but re-titled)

Greece Deployment Group (The following units were attached when the brigade was engaged in Greece between 26/02/41–1/05/41)

 2nd Regiment, Royal Horse Artillery (Field artillery)
 102nd (Northumberland Hussars) Anti-Tank Regiment, Royal Artillery
 55th Light Anti-Aircraft Regiment, Royal Artillery
 3 Field Squadron, Royal Engineers
 142 Field Park Squadron, Royal Engineers
 1st Armoured Brigade Company, Royal Army Service Corps
 1st Support Group Company, Royal Army Service Corps
 4th Light Field Ambulance, Royal Army Medical Corps

Armoured Brigade Group (March–June 1942)

 11th Battalion, The Nottinghamshire and Derbyshire Regiment (Sherwood Foresters)
 104th (Essex Yeomanry) Regiment, Royal Horse Artillery (Field artillery)
 7 Field Troop, Royal Engineers to 4/5/42
 20 Field Troop, Royal Engineers from 4/5/42
 67 Company, Royal Army Service Corps
 307 Company, Royal Army Service Corps
 12th Light Field Ambulance, Royal Army Medical Corps

Commanding Officers 
Commanding officers of the brigade included:

 Brigadier Charles Willoughby Moke Norrie, Baron Norrie of Wellington, New Zealand & Hawkesbury Upton 3/9/39–17/4/40
 (Acting) Colonel C. F. Ledward 17/4/40–12/4/40
 Brigadier Harold 'Rollie' Vincent Spencer Charrington 11/4/40–2/6/41
 (Acting) Lieutenant-Colonel Reginald Keller 2/6/41–16/6/41
 Brigadier Harold 'Rollie' Vincent Spencer Charrington 16/6/41–20/6/41
 (Acting) Lieutenant-Colonel Reginald Charles Keller 20/6/41–26/7/41
 (Acting) Lieutenant-Colonel Henry Dinham Drew 26/7/41–30/7/41
 Brigadier Edward Cecille Neville Custance 30/7/41–20/9/41
 (Acting) Lieutenant-Colonel W. I. Leethan 20/9/41–26/10/41
 Brigadier Douglas Arnold Stirling 26/10/41–23/11/41
 (Acting) Lieutenant-Colonel R. B. Sheppard 23/11/41–27/3/42
 Brigadier Arthur Francis Fisher 27/3/42–26/6/42
 Brigadier George Herbert Norris Todd 26/6/42–21/11/42

See also
 British Armoured formations of World War II
 List of British brigades of the Second World War

Notes

References

 
 J.B.M. Frederick, Lineage Book of British Land Forces 1660-1978, Volume I, Wakefield, UK: Microform Academic Publishers, 1984, .

External links 
 

Military units and formations established in 1939
Armoured brigades of the British Army in World War II
Military units and formations disestablished in 1942
1939 establishments in the United Kingdom
Battle of Greece